The Wet Gunpowder Award is an Iranian symbolic award that according to organizers, is given to "ridiculous people whose chaffy character is evident to everyone and when this nature of theirs is accompanied with self-belief turns into an indefinite foolishness for them".

The organizers, who have close ties to Basij and Islamic Revolutionary Guards Corps (The award is unveiled by Basij commander Mohammad Reza Naqdi), claim award winner is "someone who is against the Islamic Revolution" and who “against their own wishes, performs a service to the revolution.”

The statue of the award is that of brain with dark glasses and hearing aids with a plaque of the Quranic verse: "Unwilling to hear, unwilling to speak, unwilling to see, then, they will not return to the way."

In 2015, they awarded a parody of Golden Bear.

Recipients

Special awards

References

Ironic and humorous awards
2013 establishments in Iran
Iranian awards